The league was televised live for the first time following a deal with the broadcaster Sky Sports.

Castleford Tigers were relegated from the Super League in 2006, while Dewsbury Rams and Sheffield Eagles gained promotion from National League Two. York City Knights and Oldham R.L.F.C. are relegated to National League Two.

National League Three was abolished for the 2007 season and rebranded as the Rugby League Conference National division.

National League One

Table 

 Rochdale and Doncaster relegated to National League Two for 2008.
 Doncaster deducted 6 points due to entering administration.

Playoffs 

Week One.
 Whitehaven (H) beat Leigh (A) (Whitehaven through to week two, Leigh are eliminated).
 Halifax (H) beat Sheffield (A) (Halifax through to week two, Sheffield are eliminated).

Week Two.
 Castleford (H) beat Widnes (A) (Castleford through to the Grand Final in week four, Widnes play in week three).
 Halifax (A) beat Whitehaven (H) (Halifax will play Widnes in week three's semi final, Whitehaven are eliminated).

Week Three.
 Widnes (H) beat Halifax (A) (Widnes are through to the Grand Final in week four, Halifax are eliminated).

Week 4.
 Castleford Tigers 42 - 10 Widnes Vikings. Match played at neutral venue Headingley Stadium.

Castleford Tigers win promotion to the Super League 2008.

External links 
 Rugby Football League

See also 
 Rugby League Championships

National Leagues
Rugby Football League Championship